Globus Bank Ltd, commonly referred to as Globus Bank or simply Globus, is one of the 26 commercial banks in Nigeria.

Overview
Globus Bank was incorporated as "Globus Bank Ltd" on March 6, 2019 and is licensed as a commercial bank by the Central Bank of Nigeria. The bank has Sixteen branches across the federation.

Governance
The Chairman of the Board is Peter Amangbo, while the Managing Director and Chief Executive Officer is Elias Igbinakenzua.

See also

 Central Bank of Nigeria

References

External links
 Website of Globus Bank Ltd
 Website of Central Bank of Nigeria

Banks of Nigeria
Banks established in 2019
Companies based in Lagos
Nigerian companies established in 2019